A partial solar eclipse will occur on November 24, 2068. A solar eclipse occurs when the Moon passes between Earth and the Sun, thereby totally or partly obscuring the image of the Sun for a viewer on Earth. A partial solar eclipse occurs in the polar regions of the Earth when the center of the Moon's shadow misses the Earth.

Related eclipses

Solar eclipses 2065–2069

Tritos series

Metonic series

References

External links 

2068 11 24
2068 11 24
2068 11 24
2068 in science